Leigh McKechnie (born 11 November 1973) is an Australian professional golfer on the PGA Tour of Australasia.

Career
McKechnie was born in Newcastle, New South Wales. He took up golf at the age of 13 being introduced by his father.

In November 2009, McKechnie won the New South Wales Open at the Vintage Golf Course in the Hunter Valley. He also lost in a playoff at the 2002 NSW Masters.

Professional wins (1)

PGA Tour of Australasia wins (1)

PGA Tour of Australasia playoff record (0–1)

References

External links

Australian male golfers
PGA Tour of Australasia golfers
1973 births
Living people